Francisco Tongio Liongson Sr. (December 3, 1869 – February 20, 1919) was a Filipino doctor and politician. He belonged to a generation of Philippine colonial subjects who struggled to evolve a national identity for their homeland in the fringes of the Spanish Empire. Late in the 18th century, the concept of being a Filipino was still nebulous and infantile. The name did not even originally apply to all the inhabitants of the Philippine archipelago, but to a small group of Spaniards born there. Motivated by the injustices prevalent in the Philippines, small colonies of native expatriate students in Europe involved themselves in the Propaganda Movement with the purpose of exposing these abuses and in the process began to assume a consciousness articulating reforms of a national interest that was consequently distinct from Spain. Liongson was one of these Filipino students in Madrid. He walked among peers who would one day become Philippine National Heroes.

Early years

Scion of the Philippine sugar gentry, Liongson was born in Pampanga's ancient capital, Villa de Bacolor to Emigdio Liongson and Eulalia Tongio.  It was an exciting time in colonial Philippines. The Suez Canal opened a month earlier on November 17, 1869, establishing a regular steamship service between the Philippines and Europe. The implementation of the Education Decree of 1863 saw the establishment of a primary school for boys and girls in each town of the country. The resulting boom in trade and influx of new ideas gave rise to an emerging educated and moneyed elite. 

After completing his primary education in Bacolor, Liongson studied at the Colegio de San Juan de Letran in Manila and earned his diplomas in Bachiller en Artes (1887), Titulo de Profesor en Segundo Enseñasa (1888) and Titulo de Agrimensor y Perito Tasador de Tierras (1889).  He arrived in Spain on August 24, 1889, on board the mail steamer Santo Domingo to study medicine at the Universidad Central de Madrid where he obtained his Licenciado en Medicina y Cirujia in June 1894 and his Doctorado en Medicina y Cirujia on October 19, 1895. To broaden his medical knowledge further, he trained in different hospitals in Paris while studying at the famous Institut Pasteur.

During his sojourn in Spain, Liongson was actively involved with the Filipino colony in Madrid interacting with fellow paisanos like his hero, Jose Rizal. The death of La Solidaridad's Jose Maria Panganiban affected him deeply. In a eulogy to the propagandist, he wrote, "From this tombstone, which safely guards your remains, will spring happy memories for a page in our history."  His love interest in the Spanish capital was centered on Maria Dolores Alonso y Castro, a native of Badajos whom he married in the chic Madrid parish of San Martin on August 28, 1895.

The healing warrior

He returned to the Philippines with his bride in November 1895. Ten months later, the Philippine Revolution was unleashed. Spanish Governor General Ramon Blanco y Erenas declared 8 Philippine provinces to be under a state of war, and Pampanga was one among them. Liongson joined the Katipunan and offered his medical services to the Philippine Revolutionary Army. He was commissioned Capitan del Cuerpo Sanidad. His Spanish wife died shortly leaving a son, Francisco Alonso Liongson. The return of Emilio Aguinaldo from his exile in Hong Kong highlighted a new phase of the revolution and Liongson's marriage to the daughter of Balbino Ventura, Nunilon Ventura y Tison on May 1, 1898.  During the Philippine–American War, he was promoted to Comandante and attached to the brigade of Gen. Tomas Mascardo. His timely and diplomatic intervention amicably resolved the anticipated armed confrontation between his superior, Mascardo, and his friend from the Filipino colony in Spain, General Antonio Luna. While in active duty, Liongson also served with other men of distinction in the faculty of medicine and surgery of the Universidad Literaria de Filipinas, the precursor of the University of the Philippines established by President of the First Philippine Republic, Emilio Aguinaldo on October 19, 1898.

The surrender of Gen. Mascardo on May 15, 1901, officially ended hostilities in the province. Liongson's work, however, was not over. Pampanga was the scene of many armed conflicts and the province suffered severe physical and economic hardships. The proliferation and rise of diseases in epidemic proportions became a major concern of the United States military health board. The presence of a European trained Filipino physician added prestige and credibility to their efforts to combat disease. In acknowledgement of his valuable medical service, Liongson was appointed presidente of Pampanga's Provincial Health Board as soon as the transition to civil control was effected. Under his able leadership and precedent-setting measures, much of the resistance to modern sanitary, quarantine and health practices, caused largely by superstition and ignorance, were overcome. Pampanga went on to control the cholera epidemic of 1902, to fully eradicate the incidence of smallpox in the province by 1906, and to completely free the province of Hansen's disease by 1909.

From the ashes of war

By 1903, Liongson's parents, Capitan Midiong and Apung Laly, had since died; leaving behind agricultural landholdings ravaged by war. Faced with the tasks of salvaging the remnants of his inheritance and of supporting the inquilino families under his care, the doctor assumed the mantel of the gentleman farmer and entrepreneur, and realized that the young nation's economy needed serious restructuring and help. On August 8, 1905, at a public hearing for the reduction of tariffs on sugar and tobacco, Liongson submitted a paper on the petition to establish an agricultural mortgage bank and tariff reduction. He highlighted the great need for the insular government to relieve planters from the current depressed condition of agriculture. It was the beginning of his role as one of the sugar industry's spokespersons.  Consequently, the U.S. Congress enacted the Agricultural Bank Act (Public Act No. 243) in 1906 providing the establishment of the Agricultural Bank of the Philippine Government, the precursor of the Philippine National Bank, which was subsequently created to replace the former institution in 1916. Tariffs were gradually phased out beginning with the Payne Aldrich Act of 1909 until its complete removal in 1913 with the Underwood Tariff Act. The consequent prosperity resulted in a robust economy leading to among others the expansion of sugar crop production and milling capacities.

In January 1918, a group of large-scale sugar planters gathered in San Fernando, Pampanga to organize a central sugar mill financed from native capital. The group included Jose de Leon, Augusto Gonzalez, Francisco Liongson, Honorio Ventura, Tomas Lazatin, Tomas Consunji, Francisco Hizon, Jose P. Henson, and Manuel Urquico. At that time, foreign capital financed the construction of new centrals, and the conservative Pampanga planters considered it risky to mortgage their lands to the Philippine National Bank in order to finance the mill. Biting the bullet, the Pampanga Sugar Development Company (PASUDECO) was incorporated in April 1918 and began its first full milling operations in 1922. However, "on the first milling season in 1920 the planters paid up not only their crop loan but their original debt to the Bank."

Continuing the struggle for independence

Since 1902, the Partido Federalista, a party supported by the American insular government, dominated provincial and local elections. With the lifting of the ban on pro-independence parties in preparation for the 1907 Philippine Assembly elections, the provincial elections of 1906 resulted in the easy victory of nationalist candidates espousing independence. The pro-independence nationalist front was however splintered into many factions exhibiting various shades of independence and nationalism – from the most urgent, Urgentistas, to the most immediate, Imediatista. Even the Federalistas changed their name to Partido Nacional Progresista, the Progresistas, to give them a nationalistic flavor.  The pro-independence nationalist front had to unite in order to win a decisive victory for the coming First Philippine Assembly elections in 1907. By 1906, the various groups were reduced to two main proponents: the Partido Union Nacionalista of Rafael Palma and Felipe Agoncillo and the Partido Independista Imediatista of Manuel Quezon and Sergio Osmeña.

Liongson was a member of the Imediatista negotiating team and his friend of the Filipino Colony days in Spain, Galicano Apacible, was a member of the other party's team.  After long drawn negotiations, the two parties merged on March 12, 1906, to pursue "immediate, absolute and complete independence." All the various pro-independence parties united to form the Partido Nacionalista on April 29, 1907, to contest the seats in the First Philippine Assembly with Liongson as one of the founding members. Historian Onofre Corpuz implied that unification was attained in no small measure through the efforts of those with fraternal ties incubated in Madrid. The newly organized Nacionalistas won 31 seats (plus one seat as Manuel Quezon chose to run as an independent), the Independientes, 20; the Progresistas, 16; Imediatistas, 7; and other minor political parties, 5, out of 80 seats in the elections held in July 1907.

Wearing the political hat

The Nacionalistas dominated Philippine politics thereafter. In Pampanga, the Progresistas held on to gubernatorial post until 1912 when Gov. Macario Arnedo lost to the Nacionalista candidate, Francisco Liongson. Four years earlier, Liongson won the election but the victory was subsequently lost in a protracted legal battle due to a technicality occasioned by a series of conflicting court decisions. Manuel Quezon highlighted Liongson's victory in 1912 as "a vindication and that he was the real governor all along in spite of what the courts have decreed."

The Liongson gubernatorial term 1912–1916 were years of change, prosperity, and tranquility for Pampanga. It was the time when the first automobile and the first silent movie houses appeared in the province. It was a time when Francis Burton Harrison became the American Governor General who ushered in an "era of good feelings" characterized by the exodus of American colonial officials and intensive Filipinization of the government.  Politically, Pampanga gained more freedom to shape its own destiny but became more dependent on the central government for its needed economic and educational infrastructures. Governor Liongson spent a fair share of his time calling in favors and pulling strings to facilitate legislative and bureaucratic action that favored Pampanga's interests.  Economically, Pampanga benefited from the improved market conditions and the growth of commercial agriculture. The length of roads grew significantly, and the railroad began to ply from San Fernando East via Santa Ana and Arayat. Except for a threatened revival of the disgruntled Santa Iglesia cult which the governor peacefully resolved, the Liongson years were probably among the more peaceful and progressive times in Pampanga's history.

Independence politics

In 1914, the United States invited the Philippines to participate in the Panama-Pacific International Exposition (1915) in San Francisco and the Panama-California Exposition in San Diego to be held in the same year. These events were considered battlegrounds between the retentionist's and the pro-independence factions in the politics for Philippine independence. 

The struggle for Philippine independence had its supporters and detractors in the United States. Historically, the Democratic Party supported independence while the Republican Party opposed it and favored retention. The Republicans would paint the image of the Philippines as uncivilized, backward and unprepared for self-rule, while the Democrats thought otherwise and implemented measures to effect the rapid transition to self-rule and independence. The perception of the Philippines by the American people was therefore critical in soliciting support for either side. The Louisiana Purchase Exposition of 1904 in St. Louis, Missouri, showcased a reservation filled with Philippine minority tribes. The Philippine exhibit was very successful and popular but projected a grossly wrong impression that the country was a nation of primitive savages. The perception that Filipinos lived in trees remained in the American memory for generations.

The task of changing and improving the Philippine's image was placed on the country's organizing board of the Panama-Pacific and Panama-California events. This board was composed of Leon Maria Guerrero, president; William W. Barclay, director general and Francisco Liongson. Both Guerrero and Barclay were involved in the past St. Louis event while Liongson provided fresh inputs to the new undertaking. After the event, Governor-General of the Philippines F. B. Harrison reported,  "The result of their efforts was a complete success and has been gratifying to the people of the Philippines and their friends. For the first time the Philippine Islands were presented to the outside world by an exhibition of the education and accomplishments of the 8,000,000 civilized inhabitants of the islands, instead of an exhibit of the 1,000,000 or less partly civilized inhabitants of the mountains and more remote regions, as has been the case in exhibitions, pictures, and lectures upon so many occasions in the recent past." Aside from being a financial success, the Philippine exhibit was among the Grand Prize winners of the international expositions.

Senate

 Returning to the Philippines, Liongson barely had twenty days to campaign for the elections of the newly created Senate of the Philippines slated on October 3, 1916.  Appreciative of his great services to the nation, the voting constituents of Bulacan, Nueva Ecija, Pampanga, and Tarlac elected him to office without having fully enunciated his program.  He became Pampanga's first senator of the Third Senatorial District for the 4th Philippine Legislature in 1916 with a term of six years with Isauro Gabaldon of Nueva Ecija with a term of three years. Their election was marred with harassing charges of fraud and cheating by opposing candidate, Mariano Lim. The Senate for lack of supporting evidence dismissed the case. Lim was tried, convicted and sentenced to jail for estafa in 1917.

Liongson assumed the presidency of five committees but devoted most of his time and talents to the Comite de Sanidad.  As a medical doctor, his primary concern was the health of the populace because he regarded it as vital for the development of the nation. As such, he earned the respect and esteem of his peers, and all his initiatives merited the most dedicated support of the committee members. The number of bills presented to the Senate was indicative of his commitment to fulfill his duties.  As member of 16 other committees, he became a dedicated advocate for agriculture, commerce and industry. He championed the interest of farmers and supported the availability of funding for the prevention of rinderpest, and of credit to boost the depressed state of agriculture. People remembered his impassioned opposition to completely remove tariffs on rice importations pointing out the negative impact on domestic producers. The growth and advancement of this sector was constantly in his agenda.

Not being a lawyer, he unexpectedly intervened in debates that ventilated legal issues such as the Bill on Partnership and the Bill on Conditional Liberty for Prisoners. In the midst of monumental parliamentary controversies, Liongson demonstrated a profound knowledge and understanding of both medical and juridical sciences. In these debates, he was able to move members of the Senate to vote his way on the merits of his principled arguments. He, however, failed to convince his party mates when the Divorce Bill was deliberated on. Acting on his conscience and on the overwhelming sentiment of his constituents, Liongson opposed his own majority party's sponsored bill and gained the public's admiration when he openly declared that he would prefer death to the passage of the law that would destroy the base of the Filipino family.

The formation of the Philippine Independence Mission found Liongson among its distinguished members on November 8, 1918. Headed by Manuel L. Quezon, the Senate contingent included Senators Jose Altavas, Jose Clarin, Vicente Singson Encarnacion, Espiridion Guanco, Leoncio Imperial, Rafael Palma, Esteban Singson, Pedro Ma. Sison and Filemon Sotto. Prior to the mission's departure to the United States however, he was suddenly stricken with anthrax prompting his immediate replacement. He succumbed on February 20, 1919, leaving behind his spouse, a son and two daughters.  Thus ended the rise of a brilliant star in the Philippine political milieu.

Tributes

I wish to take advantage of this opportunity to express to you one more time the pain that was caused by the loss of your distinguished spouse whom, as you know, I loved so much in life. The services he had rendered to the nation were tremendous and will always be a satisfaction for me to be able to demonstrate with works that we have not forgotten the debt of gratitude that we all owe to the departed.

– Manuel L. Quezon, Senate President

Once more the Grim Reaper has claimed a worthy son of the Philippines in the person of Senator Francisco Liongson. A tactful legislator and businessman, he has done more for his people than many a magnate of his day. The Senator succumbed just as his powerful will was about to land him to another field of service. Had not his participation in the work of the Filipino mission been rudely interrupted by the call of death, we have not the least doubt that he would have accomplished his task worthily and creditably. But time has stifled the beatings of his heart forever, and in the condolence of resignation, we can only remember the passing of a staunch servant of the people.

– Rep. Gregorio Nieva, 2nd Dist. Tayabas

Senator Liongson did not die. Only his physical presence is missed, which after all is of least value. What remains here are his ideas. His faith, his perseverance and his unquestionable patriotism endure. While that proven patriotism, that faith, that constancy and those ideas of Senator Liongson live, Senator Liongson lives on among us. Cheers for having left his name at the top of the nation's history! Cheers for having most faithfully accomplished his duties as provincial governor, as president of the provincial health board and as member of this Body!

– Sen. Isauro Gabaldon, 3rd District

The voice of destiny has beckoned to the regions of eternal rest one who in life was our mate, the Senator of the Third District, Dr. Francisco Liongson. His pilgrimage through this valley of tears has neither been fruitless nor sterile, but has been the most beneficial to the nation's interest. In all the fields of human endeavor, Senator Liongson displayed a special interest and dedicated his intelligence in the development of those sciences that are advantageous for the Philippines. His public and private lives are now the most eloquent testimonies of the ideal he pursued whilst alive: to dedicate all his energy and activities for the service of his fatherland.

When I think of the Senator of the Third District during the time he was occupying his seat – now veiled with crepes of mourning – in this august Senate, he seated beside me and was the most committed supporter of certain issues I sucitated in the parliamentary debates. I, like the whole Archipelago, cannot help but lament at his loss. His death assumes the total sorrowful meaning of a national loss. And I say national loss, because his dynamism, his vigor and his patriotism channeled to serve the country in these historical moments will be of great and undisputed value; will be positive contributions in the task of nation building whose completion we anxiously hope for.

– Sen. Pedro Guevara. 4th District

The sadness that afflicts us in this occasion fills our eyes with tears and the tongue fails to express with certainty the bitterness and soulful sentiments for the eternal separation of one so endeared as a father, so beloved as a spouse and so admired as a statesman and citizen. Rest in peace our mourned compatriot; and be assured that, while the Senate of the Philippines exists, in a special place within it, your memory will remain enshrined as an example for the future generations and an inspiration for those who still continue struggling in this world.

– Sen. Francisco Villanueva, 7th District

He has died with the satisfaction of having done his share in bringing about his country's progress.

– Dr. Gervasio Ocampo, President – Philippine Medico-Pharmaceutical Association

His death was the loss, not of a particular province, not of any particular group or association, but of the whole country. The doctors who have participated in politics are beginning to dwindle in number, which made Dr. Liongson's early demise a source of deep regret.

– Dr. Sixto de los Angeles, Philippine Medico-Pharmaceutical Association

Dr. Liongson's services to his country should be given tribute, and that they should inspire the youth of the Islands to follow his example.

– Gov. Honorio Ventura, Pampanga

See also
 List of Philippine legislators who died in office

References

Cited sources

External links
 List of Previous Senators - Senate of the Philippines., retrieved on: 9 October 2011
 Past Pampanga Governors, Pampanga Capitol Website., retrieved on: 9 October 2011
 History of the First Philippine Assembly, National Historical Commission of the Philippines., retrieved on: 9 October 2011 
 VIEWS FROM THE PAMPANG: 169. Here's to our Health!, retrieved on: 9 October 2011
 PASUDECO Sugar Central, International Council of Monuments and Sites Philippines., retrieved on 9 October 2011

1870 births
1919 deaths
Colegio de San Juan de Letran alumni
Governors of Pampanga
Senators of the 4th Philippine Legislature
Filipino public health doctors
Filipino expatriates in Spain
People from Pampanga
Nacionalista Party politicians
Complutense University of Madrid alumni
20th-century Filipino medical doctors
19th-century Filipino medical doctors